Do Not Send Your Wife to Italy is a 1960 West German romantic comedy film directed by Hans Grimm and starring Marianne Hold, Claus Biederstaedt and Elma Karlowa.

It was shot at the Bavaria Studios in Munich. The film's art direction was by Max Mellin.

Main cast

References

Bibliography

External links 
 

1960 films
1960 romantic comedy films
German romantic comedy films
West German films
1960s German-language films
Films set in Italy
Films about vacationing
Films directed by Hans Grimm
Constantin Film films
Films shot at Bavaria Studios
1960s German films